Lockhart Shire is a local government area  in the Riverina region of New South Wales, Australia. The Shire was created in 1906 and is an agricultural and pastoral area.

The main towns and villages in the Shire include Lockhart (950 people), The Rock (860), Yerong Creek (145), Pleasant Hills (130) and Milbrulong (35). It has 1302 rural residents.

The mayor of Lockhart Shire is yet to be determined following the 2012 local government election.

Demographics

Proposed amalgamation
In May 2016 the Minister for Local Government announced that following an independent review of merger proposals, the Government decided that the Corowa and Urana shire councils merge to form the Federation Council; while the  Lockhart Shire would not amalgamate.

Heritage listings
Lockhart Shire has a number of heritage-listed sites, including:
Chinese Crossing
The Rock railway station

Council

Current composition and election method
Lockhart Shire Council is composed of nine councillors elected proportionally as three separate wards, each electing three councillors. All councillors are elected for a fixed four-year term of office. The mayor is elected by the councillors at the first meeting of the Council. The most recent election was held on 10 September 2016. However, in C Ward there was an equal number of candidates, being those below, that nominated for election. There being no additional candidates, the election for C Ward was uncontested. An election was held for A and B Wards. The makeup of the Council is as follows:

The current Council, elected in 2016, in order of election by ward, is:

See also
 Riverina Water County Council

References

 
Local government areas of the Riverina
Local government areas of New South Wales